White Zone is the nineteenth studio album by Hawkwind, released under the band name Psychedelic Warriors in 1995. The name change reflects that this was a musical departure for the band; being an ambient techno album rather than rock, the album is completely instrumental (except for samples) and there is little guitar featured.

Track listing
"Am I Fooling" (Brock, Davey, Chadwick) - 1:28
"Frenzzy" (Brock) - 5:48
"Pipe Dreams" (Brock) - 3:38 - from Strange Trips and Pipe Dreams
"Heart Attack" (Brock) - 0:54
"Time And Space" (Brock, Davey) - 4:04
"The White Zone" (Brock) - 7:32 - from Strange Trips and Pipe Dreams
"In Search of Shangrila" (Brock) - 5:35
"Bay of Bengal" (Brock) - 1:35
"Moonbeam" (Chadwick) - 4:08 - from Chalice of the Stars
"Window Pane" (Davey) - 5:08
"Love in Space" (Davey) - 5:20

Personnel
Psychedelic Warriors
Dave Brock - guitar, keyboards
Alan Davey - bass guitar, keyboards
Richard Chadwick - drums
Dave Charles - sampler, OSCI

Release history
Feb 1995: Emergency Broadcast, EBSSCD113, UK CD digipak
May 1995: Griffin Music, GCD376-2, USA CD
May 2010: Atomhenge (Cherry Red) Records, ATOMCD1023, UK CD

References

External links
Atomhenge Records

1995 albums
Hawkwind albums
Instrumental albums